Rudolf Brack (born 15 May 1941) is a Swiss former swimmer. He competed in the men's 200 metre breaststroke at the 1964 Summer Olympics.

References

External links
 

1941 births
Living people
Olympic swimmers of Switzerland
Swimmers at the 1964 Summer Olympics
Place of birth missing (living people)
Swiss male breaststroke swimmers